Horse Feathers is a 1932 pre-Code comedy film starring the Marx Brothers. It stars the Four Marx Brothers (Groucho, Harpo, Chico, and Zeppo), Thelma Todd and David Landau. It was written by Bert Kalmar, Harry Ruby, S. J. Perelman, and Will B. Johnstone. Kalmar and Ruby also wrote the original songs for the film. Several of the film's gags were taken from the Marx Brothers' stage comedy from the 1900s, Fun in Hi Skule. According to the Oxford English Dictionary, the term "horse feathers" is U.S. slang for "nonsense, rubbish, balderdash," attributed originally to Billy DeBeck.

Plot
The film revolves around college football and a game between the fictional Darwin and Huxley Colleges. Professor Quincy Adams Wagstaff, the new president of Huxley College, is convinced by his son Frank, a student at the school, to recruit professional football players to help Huxley's losing football team. Baravelli is an "iceman", who delivers ice and bootleg liquor from a local speakeasy. Pinky is also an "iceman", and a part-time dogcatcher. Through a series of misunderstandings, Baravelli and Pinky are accidentally recruited to play for Huxley instead of the actual professional players.

The climax of the film, which ESPN listed as first in its "top 11 scenes in football movie history," includes the four protagonists winning the football game by successfully performing a version of the hidden ball trick and then scoring the winning touchdown in a horse-drawn garbage wagon that Pinky rides like a chariot. A picture of the brothers in the "chariot" near the end of the film made the cover of Time magazine in 1932.

Cast
Groucho Marx as Professor Quincy Adams Wagstaff
Harpo Marx as Pinky
Chico Marx as Baravelli
Zeppo Marx as Frank Wagstaff
Thelma Todd as Connie Bailey
David Landau as Jennings
Uncredited Cast

Musical numbers
"I'm Against It"
"I Always Get My Man"
"Everyone Says I Love You"  
"Collegiate" (Chico playing)
"Bridal Chorus"
"Wedding March"

The film prominently features the song "Everyone Says I Love You", by Bert Kalmar and Harry Ruby. (This song was later the title song of a 1996 Woody Allen movie). All four brothers perform the song, almost every time as a serenade to Connie Bailey. Zeppo leads  with a "straight" verse:

Harpo whistles it once to his horse, and later plays it on the harp to serenade Miss Bailey. Chico sings a comic verse, with his standard fake Italian accent, while playing piano:

Groucho sings a sarcastic verse, sitting in a canoe strumming a guitar as Miss Bailey paddles. This is in line with his suspicions about the college widow's intentions throughout the film.

Notable scenes
In the opening number Wagstaff and a group of college professors sing and dance in full academic robes and mortarboard hats:

A later scene features Baravelli guarding the speakeasy and Wagstaff trying to get in. The password for entry is "Swordfish". This sequence degenerates into a series of puns:

At the door, Pinky is also asked the password. He responds by pulling a fish from his coat and sticking a small sword down its throat.

Later Wagstaff and Baravelli debate the cost of ice. Wagstaff argues that his bill should be much smaller than it is:

And on another subject: 
 

A notable scene taken from the earlier revue Fun in Hi Skule consists of the brothers disrupting an anatomy class. The professor asks for a student to explain the symptoms of cirrhosis. Baravelli obliges:

The professor protests that his facts are in order: Baravelli and Pinky bear him out. Wagstaff takes over the class and continues the lecture.

A little later, Wagstaff advises Pinky that he can't burn the candle at both ends. Pinky then reaches into his trenchcoat, and produces a candle burning at both ends.

Foreshadowing the "stateroom" scene from the 1935 film A Night at the Opera, all four Marx brothers and the main antagonist take turns going in and out of Connie Bailey's room, and eventually their movements pile up on each other, resulting in a crowded, bustling scene, notable both by Groucho's breaking of the fourth wall during Chico's piano solo, and his constant opening of his umbrella and removing his overshoes upon entering the room. The overshoes were commonly known as 'rubbers', a reference to contraceptives, a visual gag about Groucho's intentions towards Connie.

Eventually, Pinky and Baravelli are sent to kidnap two of the rival college's star players to prevent them from playing in the big game. The intended victims (who are much larger men than Pinky and Baravelli) manage to kidnap the pair instead, removing their outer clothing and locking them in a room. Pinky and Baravelli make their escape by sawing their way out through the floor. The saws came from a tool bag Pinky carried with them that held their kidnappers' tools, which included, among other things, rope, chisels, hammers and at one point, a small pig. This is an example of the surreal edge of Marx Brothers humor.

One direct example of that influence occurs in the speakeasy scene. Two men are playing cards, and one says to the other, "cut the cards". Pinky happens to walk by at that moment, pulls a hatchet out of his trenchcoat and chops the deck in half. This none-too-subtle gag, recycled from the brothers' first Broadway show, I'll Say She Is (1924), was repeated by Curly Howard against Moe Howard in The Three Stooges' short Ants in the Pantry (1936), and by Bugs Bunny in Bugs Bunny Rides Again (1948).

Reception

Mordaunt Hall of The New York Times wrote that the film "aroused riotous laughter from those who packed the theatre" on opening night. "Some of the fun is even more reprehensible than the doings of these clowns in previous films," Hall wrote, "but there is no denying that their antics and their patter are helped along by originality and ready wit." "Laffs galore, swell entertainment," wrote Variety, while Film Daily reported, "Full of laughs that will rock any house." John Mosher of The New Yorker called the film "a rather more slight and trivial affair than the other Marx offerings," but still acknowledged the Marxes as "very special; there is no one else like Groucho or Harpo on stage or screen, and probably never will be. So familiar now is the sense of humor they arouse that the mere idea of their presence starts a laugh."

The film is recognized by American Film Institute in these lists:
 2000: AFI's 100 Years ... 100 Laughs – #65
 2005: AFI's 100 Years ... 100 Movie Quotes:
 Baravelli: "You sing-a high."
 Connie Bailey: "Yes, I have a falsetto voice."
 Baravelli: "That's-a funny; my last pupil she got-a false set-a teeth."
 – Nominated
 2008: AFI's 10 Top 10:
 Nominated Sports Film

Production
The caricatures of the four brothers that are briefly flashed during the credits are taken from a promotional poster from their previous film, Monkey Business.

Chico's injury                                                                                                                            
Production of the film was hindered when Chico was severely injured in a car accident, suffering a shattered knee and multiple broken ribs. This delayed production by more than two months and limited Chico's participation in filming.

As a result, the movie was filmed so that Chico was sitting down in the majority of scenes he was in. It required a body double to be used in some of the football scenes, most notably during the shot where the Four Marx Brothers chase a horse-drawn garbage wagon, climb in and head off in the opposite direction; Chico's double is taller than the other brothers by several inches.

Period references
A term that occurs often in Horse Feathers, but may not be familiar to modern viewers, is college widow (see also The College Widow, a 1904 play).  The somewhat derogatory term referred to a young woman who remains near a college year after year to associate with male students.  It is used to describe Connie Bailey. Such women were considered "easy". Miss Bailey is shown to be involved with each of the characters played by the Brothers, as well as the principal antagonist Jennings.

At one point during the climactic football game, Wagstaff exclaims, "Jumping anaconda!" This is a ‘minced oath’, an expression used in sports stories of the time to show the colourful language used by coaches, without using actual samples, not then considered fit to print. This particular one also alludes to the notorious stock market performance of Anaconda Copper immediately preceding the Great Depression. All of the Marx Brothers had experienced severe losses in the Wall Street Crash of 1929. Groucho had delivered other jokes related to the stock market in the Brothers' preceding films (for example, "The stockholder of yesteryear is the stowaway of today" in Monkey Business), and used Anaconda itself in a Eugene O’Neill parody in 1930's Animal Crackers.

Missing sequences

The only existing prints of this film are missing several minutes, owing to censorship and damage. The damage is most noticeable in jump cuts during the scene in which Groucho, Chico and Harpo visit Connie Bailey's apartment.

Connie: Baravelli, you overcome me.
Baravelli: All right, but remember—it was your idea.

Several sequences were cut from the film, including an extended ending to the apartment scene, additional scenes with Pinky as a dogcatcher, and a sequence in which the brothers play poker as the college burns down. (A description of the latter scene still exists in a pressbook from the year of the film's release, along with a still photograph.)  The August 15, 1932 Time magazine review of the film says of Harpo in the speakeasy scene, "He bowls grapefruit at bottles on the bar."  This joke is also missing from the current print.

See also
List of United States comedy films
List of incomplete or partially lost films

References
Explanatory notes

Citations

External links

 
 
 
  Marx-Brothers.org

Marx Brothers (film series)
American football films
1932 films
American black-and-white films
American sports comedy films
1930s English-language films
Films directed by Norman Z. McLeod
Films set in universities and colleges
Films set in Maine
Paramount Pictures films
Films produced by Herman J. Mankiewicz
1930s sports comedy films
1930s American films
English-language sports comedy films